Kim Sung-eun (born September 16, 1983) is a South Korean actress.

Filmography

Television series

Film

Television show

CF

Awards and nominations

References

External links
Kim Sung-eun at Mystic Entertainment official website

Living people
1983 births
Mystic Entertainment artists
People from Anyang, Gyeonggi
South Korean film actresses
South Korean television actresses
South Korean television personalities
Sejong University alumni
20th-century South Korean actresses
South Korean Buddhists